is a Japanese manga series written and illustrated by Shimimaru. It was serialized in Shueisha's seinen manga magazine Ultra Jump from July 2014 to June 2022, with its chapters collected in nine tankōbon volumes.

Publication
Written and illustrated by Shimimaru, Dasei 67 Percent was serialized in Shueisha's seinen manga magazine Ultra Jump from July 19, 2014, to June 17, 2022. Shueisha collected its chapters in nine tankōbon volumes, released from August 19, 2015. to August 19, 2022.

Volume list

Reception
The series ranked #2 in the October 2015 edition of Takarajimasha's Kono Manga ga Sugoi! Web.

References

Further reading

External links
 

Sex comedy anime and manga
Seinen manga
Shueisha manga
Slice of life anime and manga